Jula may refer to the following people
Given name
 Jula (singer) (Julita Fabiszewska, born 1991), Polish singer and songwriter
Jula De Palma (born 1931), Italian singer

Surname
 Emil Jula (1980–2020), Romanian football player 
Vasile Jula (born 1974), Romanian football player

See also
Yula (name)